The 1981 Houston Oilers season was the franchise's 22nd overall and the 12th in the National Football League (NFL). Bum Phillips was fired as head coach during the offseason for failing to reach the Super Bowl, and replaced by Ed Biles. However, the Oilers defensive problems would catch up with them as they finished with a disappointing 7-9 record, as Earl Campbell fought through injuries to rush for 1,376 yards. After a fast 4-2 start, Houston would struggle in the second half, going 3-7 in their final 10 games, including a critical loss to the New Orleans Saints, who finished 4-12 in 1981.

The last remaining active member of the 1981 Houston Oilers was defensive lineman Mike Stensrud, who retired after the 1989 season.

Offseason

NFL draft

Personnel

Staff

Roster

Regular season

Schedule

Standings

References

External links
 1981 Houston Oilers at Pro-Football-Reference.com

Houston Oilers
Houston Oilers seasons
Houston